Sophie of Mecklenburg may refer to: 

 Sophie of Mecklenburg (1481–1503), daughter of Magnus II, Duke of Mecklenburg, and wife of John, Elector of Saxony
 Sophie of Mecklenburg, Duchess of Brunswick-Lüneburg (1508–1541), daughter of Henry V, Duke of Mecklenburg, and wife of Ernest I, Duke of Brunswick-Lüneburg
 Sophie of Mecklenburg-Güstrow, daughter of Ulrich, Duke of Mecklenburg, and wife of Frederick II of Denmark
 Sophie of Mecklenburg-Güstrow, Duchess of Württemberg-Oels (1662–1738), daughter of Gustav Adolph, Duke of Mecklenburg-Güstrow, and wife of Christian Ulrich I, Duke of Württemberg-Oels
 Duchess Sophia Frederica of Mecklenburg-Schwerin (1758–1794), daughter of Duke Louis of Mecklenburg-Schwerin, and wife of Frederick, Hereditary Prince of Denmark
 Duchess Elisabeth Sophie of Mecklenburg (1613–1676), daughter of John Albert II, Duke of Mecklenburg, and wife of Augustus the Younger, Duke of Brunswick-Lüneburg
 Sophia Louise of Mecklenburg-Schwerin (1685-1735), daughter of Frederick, Duke of Mecklenburg-Grabow, and wife Frederick I of Prussia
 Duchess Ulrike Sophie of Mecklenburg-Schwerin (1723-1813), daughter of Christian Ludwig II, Duke of Mecklenburg-Schwerin
 Sophie of Pomerania, Duchess of Mecklenburg (1460–1504), wife of Magnus II, Duke of Mecklenburg